The 2019–20 Penn Quakers men's basketball team represent the University of Pennsylvania in the 2019–20 NCAA Division I men's basketball season. The Quakers, led by 5th-year head coach Steve Donahue, play their home games at The Palestra in Philadelphia, Pennsylvania as members of the Ivy League.

Previous season
The Quakers finished the 2018–19 season 19–12 overall, 7-7 in Ivy League play, to finish in a three-way tie for fourth. They qualified for the Ivy League tournament due to winning the tiebreaker, where they were defeated by Harvard in the semifinals.

Roster

Schedule and results

|-
!colspan=12 style=| Non-conference regular season

|-
!colspan=12 style=| Ivy League regular season

|-
!colspan=12 style=| Ivy League tournament
|-

|-

Source

References

Penn Quakers men's basketball seasons
Penn Quakers
Penn Quakers men's basketball
Penn Quakers men's basketball